Mark Padmore  (born 8 March 1961) is a British tenor appearing in concerts, recitals, and opera.

He was born in London on 8 March 1961, and raised in Canterbury, Kent, England. Padmore studied clarinet and piano prior to his gaining a choral scholarship to King's College, Cambridge. He graduated in 1982 with an honours degree in music.

Padmore has appeared in the St Matthew and St John Passions with the Berlin Philharmonic and Sir Simon Rattle, staged by Peter Sellars, including Berlin, Salzburg, New York and the BBC Proms.

In the opera house, Padmore has worked with directors Peter Brook, Katie Mitchell, Mark Morris and Deborah Warner. Recent work includes the leading roles in Harrison Birtwistle's The Corridor and The Cure at the Aldeburgh Festival and in London; Handel Jephtha for WNO and ENO and Captain Vere in Britten Billy Budd and Evangelist in a staging of St
Matthew Passion for Glyndebourne Festival Opera. He also played Peter Quint in an acclaimed BBC TV production of Britten's The Turn of the Screw and recorded the title role
in La Clemenza di Tito with René Jacobs for Harmonia Mundi. Padmore appeared as Third Angel/John in George Benjamin's Written on Skin with the Royal Opera, Covent Garden in  2017.

In concert, he has performed with the world's leading orchestras including the Munich Radio, Berlin, Vienna, New York and London Philharmonic Orchestras, the Royal Concertgebouw Orchestra, Boston and London Symphony Orchestras and the Philharmonia.

Padmore has given recitals worldwide. He appears frequently at Wigmore Hall, London where he first sang all three Schubert song cycles in May 2008, was their Artist in Residence in the 2009/10 season.

His discography includes Beethoven Missa Solemnis with Bernard Haitink and Symphonieorchester des Bayerischen Rundfunks on BR Klassik and
lieder by Beethoven, Haydn and Mozart with Kristian Bezuidenhout for Harmonia Mundi with whom Padmore has also recorded Handel arias As Steals the Morn with the English Concert (BBC Music Magazine Vocal Award); Schubert cycles with Paul Lewis (Winterreise won the 2010 Gramophone magazine Vocal Solo Award); Schumann Dichterliebe with Kristian Bezuidenhout (2011 Edison Klassiek Award) and Britten Serenade, Nocturne and Finzi Dies Natalis with the Britten Sinfonia (ECHO/Klassik 2013 award); The staged St Matthew Passion with the Berlin Philharmonic and Rattle was awarded the BBC Music Magazine 2013 DVD Award.

He was appointed Commander of the Order of the British Empire (CBE) in the 2019 Birthday Honours for services to music.

In a May 2020 interview, actress Josette Simon said that she and Padmore had previously been married and had a daughter together.

References

External links
Artist's website, accessed 25 January 2010

New York Times review by Steve Smith (26 February 2009), accessed 25 January 2010
Classical Archives Interview

English operatic tenors
Living people
1961 births
British performers of early music
People educated at Simon Langton Grammar School for Boys
Alumni of King's College, Cambridge
Musicians from London
Musicians from Kent
People from Canterbury
Edison Classical Music Awards winners
Commanders of the Order of the British Empire
Choral Scholars of the Choir of King's College, Cambridge